Lagerfelt is a surname. Notable people with the surname include:

 Caroline Lagerfelt (born 1947), American actress
 Karl-Gustav Lagerfelt, Swedish diplomat

See also
Lagerfeld